Tarnoslivka is a village in Ardino Municipality, Kardzhali Province, southern-central Bulgaria. It covers an area of 7.929 square kilometres and as of 2013 had a population of 118 people.

References

Villages in Kardzhali Province